Michael Cunning (born July 30, 1958) is an American professional golfer.

Cunning was born in Phoenix, Arizona. He played collegiately at the University of Arizona. He turned professional in 1980.

Cunning played on the PGA Tour in 1984, making only one cut in 16 events. He played again on the Tour in 1992 after finishing T13 at the 1991 Q-school. In 1992, he made 11 cuts in 30 events with one top 10 finish and lost his tour card by finishing 165th on the money list. He played on the Nike Tour in 1993, makin 14  cuts in 23 events with two top 10 finishes. He has played only sparingly in the U.S. since then.

Cunning has played in Asia since 1981, and has been a regular on the Asian Tour since it began in its modern form in 1995. In 1997 he topped the Order of Merit with earnings of US$170,619, despite a best tournament finish of second place. In 2003 he won his only Asian Tour title to date at the Royal Challenge Indian Open. He has also made appearances on the European Tour and the Japan Golf Tour.

In 2009 he won the Aberdeen Brunei Senior Masters on the European Senior Tour.

Professional wins (9)

Asian Tour wins (1)

Asian Tour playoff record (0–1)

Korean Tour wins (1)
1994 Korea Open

South American Tour wins (1)
1994 Paraguay Open

Other wins (4)
1989 São Paulo Classic (Brazil)
1994 Pearl Heights Open (Taiwan)
1996 Rolex Masters (Singapore)
2006 Long Beach Open

European Senior Tour wins (2)

See also
1983 PGA Tour Qualifying School graduates

References

External links

American male golfers
Arizona Wildcats men's golfers
PGA Tour golfers
Asian Tour golfers
European Senior Tour golfers
Golfers from Phoenix, Arizona
1958 births
Living people